The Massachusetts Law Enforcement Memorial is a memorial installed in Boston's Beacon Hill neighborhood, in the U.S. state of Massachusetts. The memorial that was first displayed in 2004, sculpted by Michael Kenny, features a stone in the shape of a badge, a circular stone disk, and inscriptions of the names of law enforcement officials. Inscribed on the memorial, there are more than 340 names of law enforcement officers who died in the line of duty.

References

Beacon Hill, Boston
Monuments and memorials in Boston
Outdoor sculptures in Boston
Stone sculptures in Massachusetts